Devil in the Details is the sixth studio album by the Swedish metal band The Poodles released on March 24, 2015, marking a new collaboration with the Swedish label Gain Music. The first single off the album was "The Greatest", pre-released on January 19, 2015.

Track listing
"Before I Die" (4:24)
"House of Cards" (4:24)
"The Greatest" (3:53)
"Crack in the Wall" (3:54)
"(What the Hell) Baby" (3:15)
"Everything" (3:05)
"Stop" (3:06)
"Need to Believe" (4:10)
"Alive" (3:31)
"Life Without You" (4:05)
"Creator and Breaker" (3:41)
"Borderline" (4:10)

Charts

References

2015 albums
The Poodles albums